Richard J. Reynolds High School now the Richard J. Reynolds Magnet School for the Visual and Performing Arts (often simply R. J. Reynolds High School or Reynolds) is a high school in the Winston-Salem/Forsyth County Schools located in Winston-Salem, North Carolina. Named for R. J. Reynolds, the founder of the R. J. Reynolds Tobacco Company, the school opened in 1923. The school colors are Old Gold and Black, and the school's mascot is a Demon.

Establishment
Katharine Smith Reynolds-Johnston, the widow of R. J. Reynolds and the mother of Zachary Smith Reynolds, donated funds and land for the creation of the school in memory of her first husband. The site was known as Silver Hill. Just weeks before Reynolds-Johnston's death, a souvenir program for the dedication of the Memorial Auditorium says: "In 1919, the City of Winston-Salem, in the course of its ex-tended school building program, planned a model high school, and wished to honor the memory of Richard J. Reynolds, by naming it 'The Richard J. Reynolds High School.' It seemed to his wife, now Mrs. J. Edward Johnston, that a memorial of this kind was very fitting, as Mr. Reynolds had had such a large part and was so interested in the development of this city. Mrs. Johnston had wanted to erect some really worth while memorial personally, and when notified of the action of the city authorities, it seemed that this plant, which would be so closely identified with the life of the people, young and old, presented the opportunity for which she was looking. She therefore notified the city that she would be glad to give a suitable site upon which to erect the high school, the selection to be left to the City, and to present as a personal memorial, a beautiful auditorium in connection with the high school plant."

Campus
The School and Auditorium sit on a piece of land known as "Society Hill". The complex consists of five buildings, three of which are contributing buildings on the National Register of Historic Places. They are the High School Building (1922–1923), the Power House (1923), and the Auditorium (1923–1924).  They were designed in the late 1910s by architect Charles Barton Keen of Philadelphia and built as part of a single project.

Original plans for the School included two grand school buildings sitting on either side of an Auditorium.  Construction on the School began in 1919, under the direction of Reynolda House architect Charles Barton Keen.  The first classroom building was finished in 1923, but construction on the second building was delayed and eventually abandoned after the Stock Market Crash of 1929. In the early 1990s, the high school building was thoroughly renovated and restored to its original appearance with some modern updating (e.g., a computer lab to replace the former language lab, and central air-conditioning).

The R. J. Reynolds Memorial Auditorium is on the campus and is often used for school functions. The auditorium was constructed in 1924, and a formal opening was held the same year, with Harry Houdini performing. An extensive renovation was completed in 2003.  A customized acoustical shell was added to Reynolds Auditorium in 2009.

A fine arts/performing arts building, named the Judy Voss Jones Arts Center for a member of the class of 1968, is on the campus between the R. J. Reynolds Memorial Auditorium and Hawthorne Road. Reynolds became a magnet school for the arts in fall of 2007.

The Richard J. Reynolds High School and Richard J. Reynolds Memorial Auditorium was listed on the National Register of Historic Places in 1991.

To mark the school's 100th anniversary, artist Nick Bragg created an 32-inch by 8-foot mural Silver Hill to Diversity on the second floor whose 40 images illustrate  events in the school's history as well as major events in world history. It is the 24th mural created by Bragg, whose work is featured in other areas of the campus.

Notable alumni

Bonnie Angelo  journalist and author
Robert J. Bach  former President of Entertainment & Devices Division at Microsoft
Richard Burr  United States Senator
Howell Binkley  professional light designer in New York City
Debra Conrad  member of the North Carolina House of Representatives from the 74th district
Carter Covington  television writer and producer
Luciano Delbono  former professional soccer player
Kenny Duckett  former NFL wide receiver
Rick Duckett  college basketball coach
Mitch Easter  musician, songwriter, and record producer
Jim Ferree  professional golfer who played on the PGA Tour and Senior PGA Tour
Ben Folds  musician
Lois Patricia (Peaches) Golding  High Sheriff of Bristol, England, 2010–11
Tommy Gregg  former MLB player and current coach
Kimani Griffin  American speed skater who competed at the 2018 Winter Olympics
Julianna Guill  actress
George Hamilton IV  American country musician
Mark Harris  pastor and politician
Whit Holcomb-Faye  professional basketball player
Peter Holsapple  musician who formed The dB's, a jangle-pop band
Frank L. Horton  founder of the Museum of Early Southern Decorative Arts
Greg Humphreys  singer, guitarist, and songwriter
Othello Hunter (born 1986)  NBA player, professional basketball player for Maccabi Tel Aviv of the Israeli Premier League and EuroLeague 
Burgess Jenkins  actor
Lindsay Jones  composer and sound designer for theatre and film
Earline Heath King  sculptor who specialized in portraits and statues
Anthony Levine  NFL safety
Ed Lyons  former MLB second baseman
Melissa McBride  actress best known for her role as Carol Peletier on the AMC series The Walking Dead
Norman M. Miller  highly decorated USN Aviator during World War II
Phil Morrison  film director
Ryan Odom  men's college basketball head coach
T. R. Pearson  writer
Riley Redgate  author of young adult fiction
Brian Robinson  basketball coach
Stuart Scott  former ESPN anchor, sportscaster and media personality
Chris Stamey  musician, singer, songwriter, and record producer
Reyshawn Terry  professional basketball player and 2005 NCAA Champion with North Carolina
Michael Wilson  stage and screen director
Earl P. Yates  former rear admiral in the United States Navy

References

External links
 Richard J. Reynolds High School

High schools in Winston-Salem, North Carolina
Public high schools in North Carolina
Magnet schools in North Carolina
School buildings on the National Register of Historic Places in North Carolina
School buildings completed in 1923
National Register of Historic Places in Winston-Salem, North Carolina
Buildings and structures associated with the Reynolds family
1923 establishments in North Carolina